Torbjørn Løkken (born 28 June 1963) is a Norwegian nordic combined skier who competed from 1985 to 1990. He won two medals at the 1987 FIS Nordic World Ski Championships in Oberstdorf with a gold in the 15 km individual and a silver in the 3×5 km team events.

Løkken also competed at the 1988 Winter Olympics in Calgary, finishing sixth in the individual and fourth in the team events. He also won the Nordic combined event at the 1988 Holmenkollen ski festival and earned four additional individual victories in his career from 1986 to 1988. He took a year off after the 1987–88 season, and attempted a comeback in 1989–90, but quit midway through the season, claiming he no longer had the motivation to compete.

He has his education from the Norwegian School of Sport Sciences.

After retiring from the sport, Løkken had a troubled life. In November 2007, he came forward and revealed that he was a recovering alcoholic and drug addict, having abused alcohol, pills and eventually heroin for 15 years.

References

External links
 
 Holmenkollen winners since 1892 – click Vinnere for downloadable pdf file 

1963 births
Nordic combined skiers at the 1988 Winter Olympics
Holmenkollen Ski Festival winners
Norwegian male Nordic combined skiers
Living people
FIS Nordic Combined World Cup winners
Norwegian School of Sport Sciences alumni
FIS Nordic World Ski Championships medalists in Nordic combined
20th-century Norwegian people